Halochromatium is a Gram-positive and motile genus of bacteria from the family of Chromatiaceae. Halochromatium bacteria occur in microbial mats from hypersaline habitates.

References

Chromatiales
Bacteria genera
Taxa described in 1998